Roberto Vezzani (born 9 March 1942) is a retired Italian heavyweight weightlifter. He competed at the 1972 Summer Olympics and finished in fifth place. Vezzani placed second-third in some individual events at the 1970, 1971 and 1972 world championships, but never won a medal in the overall competition.

References

1942 births
Living people
Olympic weightlifters of Italy
Weightlifters at the 1972 Summer Olympics
Italian male weightlifters
20th-century Italian people